Alen Muratović, (born 23 October 1979) is a Montenegrin former handball player.

Club career
After playing for Budućnost Podgorica, Muratović joined Yugoslav champions Lovćen in 2001. He helped them win two consecutive national cups (2002 and 2003). In 2003, Muratović moved abroad to Spain and signed with Cangas. He would switch to fellow Liga ASOBAL club Valladolid in 2005.

In 2008, Muratović was transferred to German team SG Flensburg-Handewitt. He suffered a shoulder injury during a friendly game in January 2009, causing him to miss the rest of the season. In May 2010, his contract was terminated by mutual consent.

In 2013, Muratović returned to handball and joined his former club Cangas.

International career
At international level, Muratović represented Serbia and Montenegro at the 2005 World Championship and 2006 European Championship. He was later a founding member of the Montenegro national team, taking part at the 2008 European Championship.

Honours
Lovćen
 Serbia and Montenegro Handball Cup: 2001–02, 2002–03

References

External links

 EHF record

1979 births
Living people
Sportspeople from Nikšić
Montenegrin male handball players
BM Valladolid players
SG Flensburg-Handewitt players
Liga ASOBAL players
Handball-Bundesliga players
Expatriate handball players
Serbia and Montenegro expatriate sportspeople in Spain
Montenegrin expatriate sportspeople in Spain
Montenegrin expatriate sportspeople in Germany